Khathia Bâ (born October 22, 1990) is a Senegalese sprint canoer who competed in the late 2000s. At the 2008 Summer Olympics in Beijing, she was eliminated in the heats of the K-1 500 m event.

References
Sports-Reference.com profile

1990 births
Canoeists at the 2008 Summer Olympics
Living people
Olympic canoeists of Senegal
Senegalese female canoeists
Place of birth missing (living people)